Abby Joseph Cohen (born February 29, 1952) is an American economist and financial analyst on Wall Street. , she continues to serve as an advisory director at Goldman Sachs, after retiring from leadership of its Global Markets Institute. Prior to March 2008, she was the firm's Chief Investment Strategist. In 2001 she was named one of the 30 most powerful women in America by Ladies Home Journal. She is also a professor at Columbia Business School.

Family and education
Cohen was born in Queens, New York, the daughter of Raymond and Shirley (née Silverstein) Joseph, emigrants from Poland. She graduated from Martin Van Buren High School in Queens. Cohen earned a B.A. in economics and computer science from Cornell University (1973) and an M.S. in economics from George Washington University (1976). She obtained her Chartered Financial Analyst (CFA) designation in 1980. Abby is Jewish.

In 1973 she married David M. Cohen. They have two daughters.

Career
Cohen began her career as an economist in 1973 at the Federal Reserve Board in Washington, D.C., serving until 1977. She worked as an economist and quantitative research director for T. Rowe Price Associates. From 1983 until 1988, Cohen was the vice president in charge of investment strategy at Drexel Burnham Lambert.

Following the Michael Milken fiasco and subsequent United States Department of Justice investigation into Drexel Burnham Lambert's affairs that led to the firm's demise, Cohen worked for a short time with Barclays de Zoete Wedd, then joined Goldman Sachs in New York City as a vice president and co-chair of the Investment Policy Committee in 1990, and was named a managing director in 1996 and a partner in 1998.

Successes and failures
She is famous for predicting the bull market of the 1990s early in the decade, and was named Institutional Investor's top strategist in 1998 and 1999. However, she developed a reputation as a so-called "perma-bull", receiving criticism for continued bullish predictions after March 2000 as the stock market entered a dramatic decline.

Her reputation was further damaged when she failed to foresee the great Bear Market of 2008. In December 2007, she predicted the S&P 500 index would rally to 1,675 in 2008, the most optimistic of 14 Wall Street forecasters. The S&P 500 traded as low as 741 by November 2008, 56% below her prediction. On March 8, 2008, Goldman Sachs announced that Cohen was being replaced by David Kostin as the bank's chief forecaster for the U.S. stock market.

Civic works
Abby Joseph Cohen has served as a trustee of Cornell University and the Brookings Institution, and during 2009–2015 was Chair of the Board of Trustees of the Jewish Theological Seminary of America. She and her husband have been supporters of the Jewish Outreach Institute, which helps to bring nominal Jews back into the Jewish religious community, and of the United States Holocaust Memorial Museum.

References

1952 births
Living people
People from Queens, New York
Economists from New York (state)
American people of Polish-Jewish descent
American women economists
Women financial analysts
Columbian College of Arts and Sciences alumni
Cornell University alumni
Goldman Sachs people
Drexel Burnham Lambert
CFA charterholders
20th-century American economists
21st-century American economists
Brookings Institution people
Martin Van Buren High School alumni
Federal Reserve economists
Columbia University faculty